20 Ans (English translation: 20 years old) is a French monthly magazine for young women published in France.

History and profile
20 Ans was founded in 1961. The magazine was published by Excelsior Publications until 2003 when it was acquired by Emap France. Emap France was acquired by the Italian media group Arnoldo Mondadori Editore in June 2006.

20 Ans is published on a monthly basis, and targets adolescents. Its readers are mostly of middle-class origin. In July 2006 its circulation reached 250,000 copies.

References

1961 establishments in France
French-language magazines
Monthly magazines published in France
Women's magazines published in France
Magazines established in 1961
Youth magazines
Arnoldo Mondadori Editore